Fubo Cycling is home to many cycling TV events in the United States and Canada. It's a TV show that's exclusive to the Fubo Cycling Package on FuboTV.

Events 
 Giro d'Italia
 Tour of Alberta
 Tour of Flanders
 Giro di Lombardi
 Milan San Remo
 Volta Cata
 Flanders Classic
 Gent Wevelgem
 Dwars door Vlaanderen
 Tour de Romandie
 Dubai
 Strade Blanche
 Gran del Piemonte
 Tour of Britain
 Aviva Women Tour
 Milano-Torino

References

Sources

External links 
 FuboTV Cycling page

American sports television series